The third season of Bake Off Celebridades premiered on Saturday, March 11, 2023, at  (BRT / AMT) on SBT, aiming to find the best celebrity baker in Brazil.

This season marks the debut of chef Carlos Bertolazzi as a judge, replacing Olivier Anquier, who left the show following production of the previous season.

Bakers

The following is a list of contestants:

Results summary

Key
  Star Baker
  Judges' favourite bakers
  Advanced
  Judges' bottom bakers
  Eliminated
  Runner-up
  Winner
  Withdrew

Technical challenges ranking

Key
  Star Baker
  Eliminated

Ratings and reception

Brazilian ratings
All numbers are in points and provided by Kantar Ibope Media.

References

External links 
 Bake Off Celebridades on SBT

2023 Brazilian television seasons